Marchalina hellenica is a scale insect that lives in the eastern Mediterranean region, mainly in Greece and Turkey. It is an invasive species in Melbourne, Australia.  It lives by sucking the sap of pine trees, mainly the Turkish Pine (Pinus brutia) and, to smaller extent, Aleppo Pine (Pinus halepensis), Scots Pine (Pinus sylvestris) and Stone Pine (Pinus pinea). It can be found in the cracks and under the scales of the bark of these trees, hidden under the white cotton-like wax it secretes. Its main form of reproduction is parthenogenesis.

The honeydew it produces is an important source of food for forest honey bees, which produce pine honey. In Greece and Turkey, about 60% of the honey production is derived from it.

It is the sole member of the genus Marchalina, though some authors argue that M. caucasica which is currently considered a synonym of M. hellenica may be a distinct species.

References

External links
 Erlinghagen, F. (2001). Portrait of an insect: Marchalina hellenica Genn. (Sternorrhyncha: Coccina: Margarodidae), important producer of honeydew in Greece. Apiacta 36: 131–137.
 Margaritopoulos, J.T., Bacandritsos, N. & Pekas, A. N. (2003). Genetic variation of Marchalina hellenica (Hemiptera: Margarodidae) sampled from different hosts and localities in Greece. Bulletin of Entomological Research 93 (5 October): 447–453.

Margarodidae
Hemiptera of Europe
Insects described in 1883